AZU or Azu may refer to:

 Azu (born 1981), Japanese R&B singer
 Azubuike Ishiekwene or Azu (born 1965), Nigerian journalist
 Aji (Ryūkyū) or azu, a title of nobility in the Ryūkyū Kingdom
 AZU, several models of the Citroën 2CV automobile
 Azu, a fictional character in the 1997 video game Mahō Gakuen Lunar!

See also 
 Azumanga Daioh, a Japanese comedy manga by Kiyohiko Azuma
 Azurocidin 1, a protein that in humans is encoded by the AZU1 gene
 Slovenian Academy of Sciences and Arts or Slovenska akademija znanosti in umetnosti (SAZU)